Mastung Road Railway Station or Mastung railway station is located in Mastung, Balochistan, Pakistan.

See also
 List of railway stations in Pakistan
 Pakistan Railways

References

External links

Railway stations in Mastung District
Railway stations on Quetta–Taftan Railway Line
Railway stations in Balochistan, Pakistan